Eoloxozus sabroskyi is a species of true fly in the genus Eoloxozus.

Distribution
Peru.

References

Neriidae
Diptera of South America
Insects described in 1961
Endemic fauna of Peru